Phallus aurantiacus is a species of fungus in the stinkhorn family. It has been found in Nigeria.

Taxonomy
The species was first described in 1841 by Camille Montagne. Synonyms include Dictyophora aurantiaca and Ithyphallus aurantiacus.

References

External links

Fungi of Africa
Fungi described in 1841
Phallales
Taxa named by Camille Montagne